Ghale is a Tibeto-Burman language of Nepal. It belongs to the group of Ghale languages. The dialects of Ghale have limited intelligibility: (south) Barpak, Kyaura, Laprak, (north) Khorla, Uiya, Jagat, Philim, Nyak

Dialects
Ethnologue divides Ghale into the Northern and Southern varieties.

Northern Ghale (4,440 speakers as of 2006) is spoken in Buri Gandaki valley in Gorkha District, Gandaki Province. Dialects are Khorla, Uiya, Jagat, Philim, and Nyak.
Southern Ghale (21,500 speakers as of 2006) is spoken in the hills south of Macha Khola in Gorkha District, Gandaki Province. Dialects are Barpak, Kyaura, and Laprak.

References 

Tamangic languages
Languages of Nepal
Languages of Gandaki Province